Stigmella filipendulae is a moth of the family Nepticulidae. It is found from Fennoscandia to the Alps and the Carpathians, and from Ireland to Poland. There is a disjunct population in Greece.

The head is ferruginous to dark fuscous. Antennal eyecaps yellow-whitish. The forewings are shining golden-brown, sometimes purplish-tinged; a pale golden-metallic vertical fascia beyond middle; apical area beyond this dark purple-fuscous. Hindwings grey. Adults are on wing from July to August and again in September. There are two generations per year.

Distribution and threat level
In England, it is found between Leckford and St. Catherine's Hill of Hampshire and is also abundant in North Somerset and southern part of Wiltshire. It is considered endangered in East Sussex and Eastbourne while in West Sussex is considered to be extinct, since there was no recordings of it there since 1905.

Ecology
The larvae feed on Filipendula vulgaris and Filipendula ulmaria. They mine the leaves of their host plant. The mine consists of a long, slowly winding corridor. The first part often follows a vein. The frass is concentrated in a narrow central line at first. Later, it is distributed more widely, occupying about two thirds of the width of the mine. Pupation takes place outside of the mine.

References

External links
Fauna Europaea
Swedish moths
 Stigmella filipendulae images at  Consortium for the Barcode of Life
lepiforum.de

Nepticulidae
Moths described in 1871
Moths of Europe